Elaeocarpus homalioides is a species of flowering plant in the Elaeocarpaceae family. It is found in West Papua (Indonesia) and Papua New Guinea.

References

homalioides
Flora of Papua New Guinea
Flora of Western New Guinea
Data deficient plants
Taxonomy articles created by Polbot